Percy Jackson and the Olympians: The Lightning Thief (Original Motion Picture Soundtrack) is the score album to the 2010 film Percy Jackson & the Olympians: The Lightning Thief. An adaptation of the 2005 novel The Lightning Thief from Rick Riordan's fantasy adventure novel series Percy Jackson & the Olympians, the film is also the first instalment in the Percy Jackson film series. The musical score is composed by Christophe Beck and was released by ABKCO Records digitally on February 5, 2010, followed by a CD release on February 15. The score was positively received by critics and audiences.

Production 
Christophe Beck composed the film's musical score, after his previous collaboration with Chris Columbus in I Love You, Beth Cooper (2009). From the onset, Columbus wanted a "traditional" and "symphonic" sound. Hence, Beck produced the score entirely with a traditional orchestra, devoid of electronic and synth music. He added that the co-relations with the characters were done with the help of melodies than instrumentation, where he had used brass music for the gods. Beck applied huge "orchestral music" to compliment the action score cues, which was his first in his theatrical career.

Track listing

Reception 
The score received acclaim from critics, praising Beck's instrumentation and composition. Jonathan Broxton praised the same, saying "Beck’s music is classically orchestral, with little to no reliance on any electronic enhancements or synthesized samples, except when required to add a nuance or texture to a certain scene that an orchestra is unable to provide. This acoustic approach is sure to please traditional film music fans." But criticised the album presentation and sequencing. Heather Pheras of AllMusic wrote "Beck brings to bear the full resources of the A-list of Hollywood orchestral musicians here, and they play a highly conventional big orchestral score to accompany the story of a teenager contending with the gods of Mount Olympus. Beck likes to have the many horns carry his alternately heroic and wistful melodies, while the massed strings provide rhythmic underpinning. It's not hard to tell what sorts of activities the musical cues accompany, as titles like "The Fury" indicate that feats of derring-do are being enacted on the big screen while Beck's galloping music fills the theater. He reserves his big main theme, appropriately enough, for a cue called "Hollywood." Indeed, this is Hollywood 101, nothing that hasn't been heard before, just as the film is strongly suggestive of similar sorts of entertainment that have sopped up lots of money from multiplexes in recent years. But it is effectively done all the same."

Filmtracks.com wrote "The Lightning Thief is no doubt an effective score in context. It may sound generic to even casual movie-goers, for its safely harmonic style and conservative instrumentation meet all expectations without exceeding them. Such listeners may also hear everything from Laurence Rosenthal's Clash of the Titans (1981) to John Ottman's Fantastic Four (2005) in this music, not mention fluttering rhythms from Goldsmith's Star Trek: The Motion Picture (1979). But it still serves its purpose and helps you root for Beck, who is one of those composers who has toiled without due recognition for too long." BBC's Michael Quinn called the score that is "packed with incident and colour even if it occasionally smacks of writing-by-numbers", and further added "Beck makes rather thin use of recognisable themes but he has a strong feel for atmosphere and offers a muscular commentary shot through with a sufficiently wide range of tonal colours to maintain interest. To the fore are heroic brass fanfares, lilting woodwinds, dramatically martial percussion, strings that soar and swoop, and clashing metallic effects augmented by electronic accents. It won’t disappoint, but it doesn’t thrill or excite either." IGN's review about the film score stated "Christophe Beck's score is perfectly mixed into the action, delivering exciting cues."

Additional music 
The Lightning Thief featured several songs by popular artists, that were not included in the soundtrack. Some of the songs include:

 "Highway to Hell" – AC/DC
 "I'll Pretend" – Dwight Yoakam
 "A Little Less Conversation (Junkie XL Remix)" – Elvis Presley
 "Poker Face" – Lady Gaga
 "Mama Told Me (Not to Come)" – Three Dog Night
 "Tik Tok" – Kesha
 "Ain't That a Kick in the Head?" – Jimmy Van Heusen and Sammy Cahn

Personnel 
Credits adapted from CD liner notes
 Production
 Composer – Christophe Beck
 Recording – Noah Snyder, Tim Lauber
 Mixing – Casey Stone
 Mastering – Dave Collins
 Editing – Fernand Bos
 Music supervision – Mike Knobloch
 Music co-ordinator – Rebecca Morellato, Teri Landi
 Score co-ordinator – Jake Monaco
 Music preparation – Joann Kane Music Services, Mark Graham
 Instruments
 Bass – Bruce Morgenthaler, Christian Kollgaard, David Parmeter, Drew Dembowski, Edward Meares, Michael Valerio, Nico Carmine Abondolo, Oscar Hidalgo
 Bassoon – Allen Savedoff, Kenneth Munday, Michael O'Donovan
 Cello – Andrew Shulman, Anthony Cooke, Armen Ksajikian, Cecelia Tsan, Dane Little, Dennis Karmazyn, Erika Duke-Kirkpatrick, George Kim Scholes, Steve Erdody, Timothy Landauer*
 Clarinet – Donald Foster, Ralph Williams, Stuart Clark
 Flute – Geraldine Rotella, Heather Clark, James Walker
 Harp – Jo Ann Turovsky
 Horn – Brian O'Connor, Daniel Kelley, David Duke, James Thatcher, Jenny Kim, Mark Adams, Richard Todd, Steven Becknell
 Keyboards – Randy Kerber
 Oboe – Chris Bleth, Jonathan Davis, Leslie H. Reed
 Percussion – Alan Estes, Gregory Goodall, Marvin B. Gordy III, Peter Limonick, Steven Schaeffer, Wade Culbreath
 Trombone – Alexander Iles, Andrew Malloy, George Thatcher, Phillip Teele, William Booth
 Trumpet – Barry Perkins, Jon Lewis, Malcolm McNab, Wayne Bergeron
 Tuba – Doug Tornquist
 Viola – Andrew Duckles, Brian Dembow, Darrin McCann, David Walther, Kathryn Reddish, Marlow Fisher, Matthew Funes, Michael Nowak, Robert A. Brophy, Roland Kato, Shawn Mann, Victoria Miskolczy
 Violin – Aimee Kreston, Alyssa Park, Amy Hershberger, Ana Landauer, Anatoly Rosinsky, Bruce Dukov, Darius Campo, Dimitrie Leivici, Endre Granat, Eun-Mee Ahn, Jacqueline Brand, Jeanne Skrocki, Julie Ann Gigante, Katia Popov, Kenneth Yerke, Kevin Connolly, Lisa Sutton, Marc Sazer, Natalie Leggett, Nina Evtuhov, Rafael Rishik, Roberto Cani, Roger Wilkie, Sarah Thornblade, Searmi Park, Serena McKinney, Shalini Vijayan, Tamara Hatwan, Tereza Stanislav, Tiffany Hu
 Vocals
 Alto – Aleta Braxton, Alice Kirwan Murray, Amber Erwin, Angie Jaree, Cindy Bourquin, Donna Medine, Drea Pressley, Edie Lehmann Boddicker, Jennifer Barnes, Karen Harper, Kimberly Switzer, Leberta Loral, Michele Hemmings, Nancy Sulahian, Nicole Baker, Niké St. Clair
 Soprano – Claire Fedoruk, Diane Freiman Reynolds, Elin Carlson, Elissa Johnston, Harriet Fraser, Jennifer Graham*, Joanna Bushnell, Karen Whipple Schnurr, Lesley Leighton, Lori Moran, Marie Hodgson, Monique Donnelly, Nikki Hassman, Samela Beasom, Teri Koide, Tyler Azelton
 Tenor – Augie Castagnola, Chris Mann, Chris Gambol, George Sterne, Gerald White, Jasper Randall, Jody Golightly, Jonathan Mack, Michael Lichtenauer, Sean McDermott, Shawn Kirchner, Tim Davis
 Orchestra
 Orchestration – Kevin Kliesch, Jake Monaco, Tim Davies
 Orchestra conductor – Tim Davies
 Contractor – Jasper Randall
 Stage engineer – Denis St. Amand
 Stage manager – Dominic Gonzales, Greg Dennen, Tom Steel
 Management
 Business affairs (ABKCO) – Peter Howard
 Business affairs (20th Century Fox) – Tom Cavanaugh
 Executive in charge of marketing (ABKCO) – Iris Keitel, 
 Executive in charge of music (20th Century Fox) – Robert Kraft
 Executive in charge of sales (ABKCO) – Joe Parker
 Executive in charge of soundtracks (ABKCO) – Alisa Coleman
 Marketing (ABKCO) – Michael Kirk, Tracey Jordan
 Packaging and design – Dale Voelker

Charts

Notes

References 

2010 soundtrack albums
Film scores
ABKCO Records soundtracks
Percy Jackson & the Olympians